Adeel Alam (born March 28, 1986) is an American professional wrestler. He is currently signed to WWE, where he performs on the Raw brand under the ring name Mustafa Ali.

Prior to signing with WWE, Alam worked on the independent circuit after his debut in 2003, while also working as a police officer in a Chicago suburb for four years. In 2016, he competed in the Cruiserweight Classic as a replacement and through his performances, earned a full-time contract with WWE. He initially worked for their new Cruiserweight Division as part of the 205 Live brand. In December 2018, he was moved to the SmackDown brand, moving out of the cruiserweight division. In July 2020, he was moved to the Raw brand. In October of that same year, he revealed himself as the leader of the villainous stable Retribution, thereby turning heel in the process.

Early life
Adeel Alam was born on March 28, 1986 in Bolingbrook, Illinois, the son of a Pakistani father from Karachi, and an Indian mother from New Delhi. He was raised in Chicago, Illinois. He has two older brothers. Alam wanted to be a wrestler since his youth, idolizing first Bret Hart and later also Eddie Guerrero, Rey Mysterio, Hardy Boyz, Chris Jericho, and Hayabusa.

Professional wrestling career

Independent circuit (2003–2016) 
Alam made his professional wrestling debut on February 2, 2003. He worked in various promotions, including Dreamwave Wrestling, where he was a former Dreamwave Alternative Champion and Dreamwave Heavyweight Champion. He also appeared in other promotions, including All American Wrestling (AAW), Freelance Wrestling, GALLI Lucha Libre, IWA Mid-South, Jersey All Pro Wrestling (JAPW), National Wrestling Alliance (NWA), Proving Ground Pro, and WrestleCircus. During his first six years as a professional wrestler, he used a mask so he would not face discrimination. He did it all during the day while working night shifts as a police officer.

WWE (2016–present)

Cruiserweight division (2016–2018) 

On June 25, 2016, after Brazilian wrestler Zumbi was not able to participate in the Cruiserweight Classic tournament due to visa issues, WWE announced that Mustafa Ali would replace him. On July 20, Ali was eliminated from the tournament by Lince Dorado in the first round. Ali appeared on the October 26 episode of NXT, where he and Dorado entered the Dusty Rhodes Tag Team Classic, but were eliminated by Kota Ibushi and TJ Perkins in the first round.

On the December 13 episode of 205 Live, Ali made his debut for the brand, wrestling Lince Dorado to a double countout. On January 23, 2017, Ali made his Raw debut, teamed with Jack Gallagher and TJ Perkins to defeat Ariya Daivari, Drew Gulak, and Tony Nese. Ali began feuding with Drew Gulak, when Gulak began his "No Fly Zone" campaign on 205 Live. The feud culminated in a two-out-of-three falls match on July 18 episode of 205 Live, which Ali won. In February 2018, Ali began participating in the Cruiserweight Championship tournament; he defeated Gentleman Jack Gallagher in the first round, Buddy Murphy in the quarterfinals, and Drew Gulak in the semi-finals to advance to the final at the WrestleMania 34. At WrestleMania on April 8, Ali lost to Cedric Alexander, failed to win the WWE Cruiserweight Championship. Ali then started a rivalry with Hideo Itami, who interfered in his match against Buddy Murphy. On the August 7 episode of 205 Live, Ali lost to Itami and collapsed afterwards, rendering him out of action for a short time. On the October 24 episode of 205 Live, Ali defeated Itami in a falls count anywhere match to end the feud. On the October 31 episode of 205 Live, Ali defeated Tony Nese to become the number one contender for the Cruiserweight Championship, but failed to win the title from Buddy Murphy at Survivor Series.

Championship pursuits (2018–2019) 
During his time in 205 Live, Ali gained the attention of WWE Chairman Vince McMahon, who decided to put him on the SmackDown brand. According to former WWE writer Kazeem Famuyide, then-WWE Champion Daniel Bryan was pushing hard backstage for a "hot young babyface" to be on television, arguing that all the babyfaces they had were pushing 40-years-old; this led to management choosing Ali for this push. Ali made his first appearance on the December 11, 2018 episode of SmackDown Live, confronting Daniel Bryan and losing to him later that night. The following week on SmackDown Live, Ali was confirmed as a full-time SmackDown roster member and teaming with AJ Styles to defeat Daniel Bryan and Andrade "Cien" Almas in a tag team match, after Ali pinned Bryan. At the Royal Rumble on January 27, 2019, Ali competed in the eponymous match, lasting 30 minutes and eliminating Shinsuke Nakamura and Samoa Joe, before being eliminated by Nia Jax. In February, Ali was scheduled to compete in the Elimination Chamber match for the WWE Championship at namesake event, which would have been his first world title match; however, he was pulled out due to a legit injury, and replaced by Kofi Kingston. Ali made his televised return at the Fastlane pay-per-view, as a last minute addition in the WWE Championship match between Daniel Bryan and Kevin Owens, which Ali lost after being pinned by Bryan. On March 25, 2019, his ring name was shortened to "Ali".

At the Money in the Bank on May 19, Ali competed in the ladder match, which he failed to win, after a returning Brock Lesnar won the match. According to Ali, he was originally booked to win the match, but before making his entrance to the ring, was instructed by Vince McMahon to not obtain the briefcase. This decision caused a lot of controversy amongst fans, but Ali admitted to have not been bothered by it. The following month, Ali would compete in the 51-man battle royal at Super ShowDown, but would fail to win. At Smackville, Ali failed to capture the Intercontinental Championship, from Shinsuke Nakamura. In August, Ali competed in the King of the Ring tournament, where he defeated Buddy Murphy in the first round, but lost to Elias in the quarterfinals. At the Hell in a Cell event, Ali lost to Randy Orton. At the Crown Jewel event, Ali competed in a ten-man tag team match as a part of Team Hogan, coming out victorious against Team Flair. On November 13, his name was reverted to "Mustafa Ali". At Survivor Series, Ali competed as a member of Team SmackDown, and was eliminated by Seth Rollins, however, his team won the match. Following this, Ali would be taken off television, wrestling primarily on dark matches and live events.

Retribution (2020–2021)

After a seven-month hiatus from television, Ali returned on the July 20, 2020 episode of Raw, teaming with Cedric Alexander and Ricochet to defeat MVP, Bobby Lashley and Shelton Benjamin, thus moving to the Raw brand. After moving to the Raw brand, Ali later began competing on WWE Main Event, trading victories in matches over the likes of Ricochet and Akira Tozawa. On the September 28 episode of Raw, Ali would return to in ring action by teaming with Ricochet and Apollo Crews and they would go on to defeat The Hurt Business after Ali used the 450 splash to pin MVP.

On the October 5 episode of Raw, Ali turned heel when he was revealed as the leader of the stable Retribution. On the October 19 episode of Raw, Ali would reveal himself as the mysterious hacker that was sending messages on SmackDown for months. That same night, Ali and Retribution would be defeated by The Hurt Business in an eight-man tag team match. The following week on Raw, Retribution would once again lose to The Hurt Business in an elimination match, ending the feud. Following this, Retribution would set their sights on Ricochet with each member, including Ali, defeating him in singles matches over the next few weeks on Raw. Afterwards, Retribution would begin a feud with The New Day or more specifically, Kofi Kingston after Ali blamed Kingston for "stealing" his WrestleMania opportunity two years prior while he was injured. At the Royal Rumble, Ali would enter at number 4 and managed to eliminate Xavier Woods before being eliminated by Big E.

On March 15 episode of Raw, Ali faced Riddle for the United States Championship but was unsuccessful in capturing the title. He faced Riddle in a rematch for the title at Fastlane but was once again unsuccessful. Following the match, Reckoning and Slapjack walked out on him while Mace and T-Bar attacked him, effectively disbanding Retribution.

Various feuds; absence and return (2021–present)
On the March 29 episode of Raw, in his first match since the disbandment of Retribution, Ali attacked Drew McIntyre after his match with Ricochet, resulting in a match against McIntyre, who emerged victorious. Shortly after, Ali renewed his rivalry with Ricochet on Main Event where they faced off in a series of matches culminating in a 2-out-of-3 falls match where Ali was defeated. In June, Ali began a storyline with Mansoor, trying to convince him that the rest of WWE superstars were "backstabbers", "would do anything just to get ahead", and "cheaters", leading to a match on the July 5 episode of Raw, where Ali handed Mansoor his first pinfall loss after outsmarting him by faking a knee injury. On the July 26 episode of Raw, Ali teamed with Mansoor at his request where they defeated T-Bar and Mace, thus turning him face.

As part of the 2021 Draft, Ali was drafted to the SmackDown brand. On the October 11 episode of Raw, Ali berated and attacked Mansoor in the backstage after they lost to The Hurt Business, reverting back to a heel and thus ending his alliance with Mansoor; challenging him to a match at Crown Jewel later that night.  At the event, Ali lost to Mansoor, and after the match, was dropped with a kick by karate silver medalist Tareg Hamedi. The following night on SmackDown, Ali faced Mansoor in a rematch but was once again defeated. On the next week's episode of SmackDown, Ali would be defeated by Drew McIntyre and shortly after would disappear from television.

On January 16, 2022, Mustafa Ali publicly requested his release from WWE which was eventually declined by Vince McMahon. A few months later, Ali returned to television on the April 25 episode of Raw, as a face and defeated The Miz. after the match, he would be attacked by Ciampa. On the May 2, broadcast of Raw, Mustafa Ali yet again interrupted Miz TV and requested a United States Championship shot. The Miz accepted the offer but turned the match into a 2-on-1 handicap match with The Miz's partner being Theory. Mustafa Ali was defeated via a Skull Crushing Finale by The Miz. Eventually however, Ali would face Theory for the United States Championship at Hell In A Cell, in an unsuccessful attempt. On the October 17 episode of Raw, Ali confronted Seth Rollins and unleashed an attack on him to end the show.

Heading into 2023, Ali started a program with Dolph Ziggler, with the two confronting each other backstage on several occasions. On the February 20 2023 episode of Raw, Ali defeated Ziggler with a roll-up and sarcastically celebrated his win.

Professional wrestling style and persona 
Ali uses a high-flying style of wrestling. Ali's finishing maneuver was an imploding 450° splash named the 054, but he retired the move since he "wants to be able to play with his grandkids". After his debut, Ali used characters different from Muslim stereotypes. During his feud with Cedric Alexander over the Cruiserweight Championship, Ali was commonly referred to as "The Heart of 205 Live", while Alexander was referred to as “The Soul of 205 Live”.

After his heel turn, he would add the Koji Clutch to his arsenal.

Other media 
Ali made his video game debut as a playable character in WWE 2K19 and has since appeared in WWE 2K20 as well as WWE 2K22.  He was the subject of a 2009 documentary focusing on issues that Muslim wrestlers face when booked as villainous characters and stereotyped as terrorists.

Personal life 
Alam is a Muslim. He met his wife Uzma in 2010. The couple got married in January 2011, and have two daughters and a son.

Alam is of Pakistani and Indian origin, however, he only represented Pakistan in his WWE debut at the Cruiserweight Classic as there were already two Indian wrestlers competing. Alam was criticized for not displaying a Pakistani flag and representing the country by his Pakistani fans in January 2017. He stated, "I don't care for nationality. I care for unity. I don't mean to offend anyone. This is just me stating that I feel nationality doesn't define us as people, it separates us."

Alam spent four years serving as a police officer in Homewood, Illinois, a suburb south of Chicago, in order to support his family before being signed to WWE.

Championships and accomplishments 
Dreamwave Wrestling
Dreamwave Alternative Championship (1 time)
Dreamwave World Championship (1 time)
Elite Pro Wrestling
EPW Pro Television Championship (1 time)
Freelance Wrestling
Freelance World Championship (1 time)
Jersey All Pro Wrestling
JAPW Light Heavyweight Championship (1 time)
Midwestern States Pro Wrestling
MSPW Heritage Championship (1 time)
Pro Wrestling Illustrated
 Ranked No. 55 of the top 500 wrestlers in the PWI 500 in 2019
Proving Ground Pro
PGP Franchise Championship (1 time)
 WrestleCrap
 Gooker Award (2020) –

References

External links 

 
 
 
 

1986 births
Living people
American male professional wrestlers
American Muslims
American sportspeople of Indian descent
American sportspeople of Pakistani descent
Professional wrestlers from Illinois
People from Bolingbrook, Illinois
American people of Pakistani descent
21st-century professional wrestlers